Mexicana may refer to:
 a woman born in Mexico
 Mexicana de Aviación, a former airline of Mexico
 Mexicana (ship), a topsail schooner built in 1791 by the Spanish Navy
 Mexicana (film), a 1945 American film
 Mexicana (genus), a genus of monogenean parasites
 Mexicana (website), a web portal
 Mexicana (Mexicana Con Orgullo), a Mexican soft drink

See also 
 Mexicano (disambiguation)